Charles la Trobe, CB (20 March 18014 December 1875), commonly Latrobe, was appointed in 1839 superintendent of the Port Phillip District of New South Wales and, after the establishment in 1851 of the colony of Victoria (now a state of Australia), he became its first lieutenant-governor.

La Trobe was a strong supporter of religious, cultural and educational institutions. During his time as superintendent and lieutenant-governor he oversaw the establishment of the Botanic Gardens, and provided leadership and support to the formation of entities such as the Mechanic's Institute, the Royal Melbourne Hospital, the Royal Philharmonic, the Melbourne Cricket Ground and the University of Melbourne.

La Trobe was the nephew of British architect Benjamin Henry Latrobe.

Early life
Charles La Trobe was born in London, the son of Christian Ignatius Latrobe, a leader of the Moravian Church, from a family of French Huguenot descent, whose mother was a member of the Moravian Church born in the United States. He was educated in England and later spent time in Switzerland and was active in mountaineering; he made a number of ascents in the Alps 1824–26. La Trobe wrote several travel books describing his experiences: The Alpenstock: Or Sketches of Swiss Scenery and Manners (1829) and The Pedestrian: A Summer's Ramble in the Tyrol (1832).

In 1832, he visited the United States along with Count Albert Pourtales and, in 1834, travelled from New Orleans to Mexico with Washington Irving. He then wrote The Rambler in North America (1835) and The Rambler in Mexico (1836).

On 16 September 1835, he married Sophie de Montmollin (1809–1854) in Berne, Switzerland. Their first child, Agnes Louisa de La Trobe, was born in Switzerland on 2 April 1837.

Lieutenant-governor
In 1837, La Trobe was entrusted with a government commission in the West Indies and reported on the future education of the recently emancipated slaves.

On 4 February 1839, he was appointed superintendent of the Port Phillip District of New South Wales, even though he had little managerial and administrative experience. With his wife and 2-year-old daughter, La Trobe sailed into Sydney on 26 July 1839, for training on procedures. The La Trobes went on to Melbourne on 1 October.

At auction, La Trobe bought  of land on the fringe of the city, in what is now called Jolimont, at the upset price of £20 an acre, Melbourne residents having agreed among themselves not to bid against the superintendent. Governor George Gipps was disturbed when he heard about it, but La Trobe convinced him that he had acted innocently. On that land, La Trobe erected his home, which he had transported from London in sections, and which is preserved as LaTrobe's Cottage.
 
Melbourne had a population of around 3,000 at the time and was rapidly expanding. La Trobe commenced works to improve sanitation and streets. As the Port Phillip District was a dependency of New South Wales, all land sales, building plans and officer appointments had to be approved by Gipps, with whom La Trobe had a good personal and working relationship.
 

A Separation Association had been formed in 1840, with the aim of making the Port Phillip District a separate colony. In 1841, La Trobe wrote to Gipps, asking him to visit Melbourne to form his own opinion on the separation question. La Trobe did not actively campaign for separation, being content that Earl Grey had included separation in the reorganisation plan for the colonies. La Trobe also acted as lieutenant-governor of Van Diemen's Land for four months in 1846–47.

In July 1851, the Port Phillip achieved separation from New South Wales, becoming the colony of Victoria, and La Trobe became lieutenant-governor – a position he held until 1854. Soon after separation, gold was discovered at several locations in Victoria. La Trobe suddenly had to deal with the mass exodus of the population of Melbourne to the gold fields, as well as the later arrival of thousands of immigrants from other Australian colonies and overseas.

He was commonly referred to as "Charley Joe", and by extension, any government officials or policemen were called "joes". Having tried, with varying degrees of success, to cope with the enormous population and economic expansion of the new colony, La Trobe, who suffered self-doubt and criticism due to his inexperience, submitted his resignation in December 1852, but had to wait until a replacement, Charles Hotham, could take his place.

After Victoria
Towards the end of his governorship, La Trobe's wife, Sophie, became ill and returned to Europe with their four children. She died on 30 January 1854. On his return to Europe after his term, La Trobe married Sophie's sister, Rose Isabelle de Meuron (1821–1883) in 1855, a marriage which was illegal in English law, being considered incestuous at the time. (See Deceased Wife's Sister's Marriage Act 1907.) The couple had two daughters (born 1856 and 1859) in Switzerland and moved to England in 1861. La Trobe did not receive any further British government appointments. His eyesight was increasingly deteriorating, and he was completely blind for the last years of his life. He died in 1875.

Geelong keys
La Trobe is also linked to the discovery of a minor piece of evidence suggesting early European exploration of Australia. In 1847, at Limeburners' Point near Geelong, Victoria, Charles La Trobe, a keen amateur geologist, was examining the shells from a lime kiln when a worker showed him a set of five keys that he claimed to have found, subsequently named the Geelong Keys. La Trobe concluded that, based on their appearance, the keys were dropped onto the beach around 100 to 150 years beforehand (i.e. between 1700 and 1750). In 1977, Kenneth McIntyre hypothesized they were dropped by Portuguese sailors under the command of Cristóvão de Mendonça. Since the keys have long been lost, their exact origin cannot be verified. However, research by geologist Edmund Gill and historian P.F.B. Alsop showed the deposit they were supposedly found in was 2330–2800 years old, making La Trobe's dating impossible.

Legacy
Much of Melbourne's substantial inner-ring parks and gardens can be attributed to La Trobe's foresight in reserving this land.

Melbourne and Victoria are dotted with things named in honour of La Trobe, including La Trobe Financial in Melbourne's CBD, La Trobe University and Charles La Trobe College in Melbourne's north east, the La Trobe Reading Room at the State Library of Victoria on La Trobe Street in the CBD, the federal electorate of La Trobe in Melbourne's outer east, the Latrobe Valley in southeastern Victoria, Mount LaTrobe in Wilsons Promontory and, in Tasmania, Latrobe and Latrobe Council.

There are statues of La Trobe outside the State Library and at La Trobe University's Bundoora campus, the latter statue is notable for initially being upside-down in appearance, symbolising Universities duty to "turn ideas on their head".

The La Trobe Journal (founded 1968) is published by the State Library of Victoria. It is devoted to Australasia, especially in connection with Victoria.

The family motto of La Trobe is used at La Trobe University for their own motto. The motto in English is "whoever seeks shall find".

The flowering plant genus Latrobea was named after him.

See also
History of Melbourne
French Australian
Latrobe nugget

References

External links
La Trobe Society
Charles Joseph La Trobe: A chronology
Genealogy of the La Trobe family
Governor La Trobe's Instructions, 11 September 1839
La Trobe statue at La Trobe University Bundoora
 

Family tree in Genealogisches Handbuch der baltischen Ritterschaften, Estland,  Görlitz 1930 
Pictures and texts of The Alpenstock, or sketches of Swiss scenery and manners, 1825-1826 by Charles Joseph Latrobe can be found in the database VIATIMAGES.

1801 births
1875 deaths
Sportspeople from London
English people of American descent
Governors of Victoria (Australia)
Politicians from Melbourne
Burials in Sussex
Colony of Victoria people
19th-century Australian politicians
Lieutenant-Governors of Victoria
19th-century Australian public servants
Settlers of Melbourne
English mountain climbers
People from Alfriston
Latrobe family
Companions of the Order of the Bath